Edward Hammond Boatner Jr. (February 2, 1924 – July 22, 1982), known professionally as Sonny Stitt, was an American jazz saxophonist of the bebop/hard bop idiom. Known for his warm tone, he was one of the best-documented saxophonists of his generation, recording more than 100 albums. He was nicknamed the "Lone Wolf" by jazz critic Dan Morgenstern because of his tendency to rarely work with the same musicians for long despite his relentless touring and devotion to jazz. Stitt was sometimes viewed as a Charlie Parker mimic, especially earlier in his career, but gradually came to develop his own sound and style, particularly when performing on tenor saxophone and even occasionally baritone saxophone.

Early life
Edward Hammond Boatner, Jr. was born in Boston, Massachusetts, and grew up in Saginaw, Michigan. He had a musical background: his father, Edward Boatner, was a baritone singer, composer, and college music professor; his brother was a classically trained pianist, and his mother was a piano teacher. He was placed for adoption in 1924 by his father and adopted by the Stitt family in Saginaw. He later began calling himself "Sonny". While in high school in Saginaw, he played in the Len Francke Band, a local popular swing band.

In 1943, Stitt met Charlie Parker. As he often recalled, the two men had similar styles. Parker is alleged to have remarked, "Well, I'll be damned, you sound just like me", to which Stitt responded, "Well, I can't help the way I sound. It's the only way I know how to play." Kenny Clarke said of Stitt, "Even if there had not been a Bird, there would have been a Sonny Stitt."

During the 1940s, he played alto saxophone as a member of Tiny Bradshaw's big band, Billy Eckstine's big band with Gene Ammons and Dexter Gordon, and Dizzy Gillespie's big band. Stitt was a leader of Bebop Boys and Galaxy in 1946 and 1948 respectively.

When playing tenor saxophone Stitt seemed to break free from some of the criticism that he was imitating Parker's style, and began to develop a far more distinctive sound. He played with other bop musicians including Horace Parlan, Bud Powell and Eddie "Lockjaw" Davis, a fellow tenor with a distinctly tough tone in comparison to Stitt, in the 1950s and recorded a number of sides for Prestige Records as well as albums for Argo, Verve, and Roost. Stitt experimented with Afro-Cuban jazz in the late 1950s, and the results can be heard on his recordings for Roost and Verve, on which he teamed up with Thad Jones and Chick Corea for Latin versions of such standards as "Autumn Leaves".

In 1952 Stitt played with pianist Jimmy Jones and the next year performed orchestral music with Johnny Richards. Under Quincy Jones's guidance in 1955 he played uptempos and ballads such as "My Funny Valentine" and "Star Dust" and the same year performed "Afterwards" and "There Will Never Be Another You" with Hank Jones. Stitt joined Dolo Coker in 1957 to perform "Blues for Yard" and "Blue Moon" before returning to Hank to perform "Cherokee".

Stitt joined Miles Davis briefly in 1960, and recordings with Davis' quintet can be found only in live settings on the tour of 1960. Concerts in Manchester and Paris are available commercially and also a number of concerts (which include sets by the earlier quintet with John Coltrane) on the record Live at Stockholm (Dragon), all of which featured Wynton Kelly, Jimmy Cobb, and Paul Chambers. However, Miles fired Stitt due to the excessive drinking habit he had developed, and replaced him with Hank Mobley. Later in the 1960s, Stitt paid homage to Parker on the album Stitt Plays Bird, which features Jim Hall on guitar.

Stitt recorded several times with his friend Gene Ammons in sessions that were interrupted by Ammons' own imprisonment for narcotics possession. The records recorded by these two saxophonists are regarded by many as some of both Ammons and Stitt's best work. The Ammons/Stitt partnership went down in posterity as one of the best dueling partnerships in jazz, alongside Zoot Sims and Al Cohn, and Johnny Griffin with Eddie "Lockjaw" Davis. Stitt ventured into soul jazz, and he recorded with fellow tenor saxophonist Booker Ervin in 1964 on the Soul People album. Stitt also recorded with Duke Ellington alumnus Paul Gonsalves in 1963 for Impulse! on the Salt and Pepper album in 1964. Around that time he appeared regularly at Ronnie Scott's in London, a live 1964 encounter with Ronnie Scott, The Night Has a Thousand Eyes, eventually surfaced, and another in 1966 with resident guitarist Ernest Ranglin and British tenor saxophonist Dick Morrissey. Stitt was one of the first jazz musicians to experiment with the Selmer Varitone amplification system as heard on the albums What's New!!! in 1966 and Parallel-a-Stitt in 1967.

Later life

In the 1970s Stitt slowed his recording output slightly but in 1972 produced another classic, Tune-Up!, which was and still is regarded by many jazz critics, such as Scott Yanow, as his definitive record. Indeed, his fiery and ebullient soloing was reminiscent of his earlier playing. In 1971 he managed to record four albums; Turn It On! with Leon Spencer, Melvin Sparks, Idris Muhammad, and Virgil Jones, You Talk That Talk! with Gene Ammons and George Freeman as new members of the group, Just The Way It Was - Live At The Left Bank with Don Patterson and Billy James, and Black Vibrations which featured the same group as in Turn It On!. Just The Way It Was - Live At The Left Bank which was released in 2000 also featured Stitt as an electric saxophone player, which was the first album which encompassed it.

Stitt's productivity dropped in the 1970s due to alcoholism. He drank heavily after giving up heroin in the late fifties and the abuse was beginning to take its toll. A series of alcohol-induced seizures caused Stitt to abstain and quit for good.

Stitt joined the all-star group The Giants of Jazz (which also featured Art Blakey, Dizzy Gillespie, Thelonious Monk, Kai Winding and bassist Al McKibbon) and made albums for Atlantic, Concord and EmArcy. His last recordings were made in Japan. A rejuvenated Stitt also toured with Red Holloway in the late 1970s, who noted a marked improvement in his playing. In 1975 he performed with Ron Burton, Major Holley and drummer    John Lewis at the Village Vanguard.

In 1981, Stitt performed with George Duvivier and Jimmy Cobb, Six weeks before his death, Stitt recorded two last consecutive sessions which were with George Duvivier, Jimmy Cobb, Bill Hardman and either Junior Mance or Walter Davis Jr. on piano.

In 1982, Stitt was diagnosed with cancer, and died on July 22 in Washington, D.C. He is buried in a wall crypt at Fort Lincoln Cemetery, Brentwood, Maryland.

Discography

As leader/co-leader
1949–50: Sonny Stitt/Bud Powell/J. J. Johnson (Prestige, 1956)
1950: Stitt's Bits (Prestige, 1958)
1950–52: Kaleidoscope (Prestige, 1957)
1953: Sonny Stitt Playing Arrangements from the Pen of Johnny Richards (Roost)
1954: Jazz at the Hi-Hat (Roost)
1954: The Battle of Birdland (Roost) with Eddie "Lockjaw" Davis
1955: Sonny Stitt Plays Arrangements from the Pen of Quincy Jones (Roost)
1956: Sonny Stitt Plays (Roost)
1956: New York Jazz (Verve)
1956: For Musicians Only (Verve)  with Dizzy Gillespie and Stan Getz
1956: 37 Minutes and 48 Seconds with Sonny Stitt (Roost)
1957: Personal Appearance (Verve)
1957: Sonny Stitt with the New Yorkers (Roost)
1957: Only the Blues (Verve)
1957: Sonny Side Up (Verve) with Dizzy Gillespie and Sonny Rollins
1958: The Saxophones of Sonny Stitt (Roost)
1958: Sonny Stitt (Argo)
1958: Burnin' (Argo)
1959: The Hard Swing (Verve)
1959: Sonny Stitt Plays Jimmy Giuffre Arrangements (Verve)
1959: A Little Bit of Stitt (Roost)
1959: Sonny Stitt Sits in with the Oscar Peterson Trio (Verve) with Oscar Peterson
1959: The Sonny Side of Stitt (Roost)
1959: Sonny Stitt Blows the Blues (Verve)
1959: Saxophone Supremacy (Verve)
1959: Sonny Stitt Swings the Most (Verve)
1960: Stittsville (Roost)
1960: Previously Unreleased Recordings (Verve)
1960: Sonny Side Up (Roost)
1961: The Sensual Sound of Sonny Stitt (Verve) with the Ralph Burns Strings
1961: Sonny Stitt at the D. J. Lounge (Argo)
1961: Dig Him! (Argo) with Gene Ammons (reissued on Prestige as We'll Be Together Again in 1969)
1961: Boss Tenors (Verve) with Gene Ammons
1962: Stitt Meets Brother Jack (Prestige) with Jack McDuff
1962: Boss Tenors in Orbit! (Verve) with Gene Ammons
1962: Soul Summit (Prestige) with Gene Ammons and Jack McDuff
1962: Feelin's (Roost)
1962: Low Flame (Jazzland)
1960–62: Stitt in Orbit (Roost)
1962: Sonny Stitt & the Top Brass (Atlantic)
1962: Rearin' Back (Argo)
1963: Stitt Plays Bird (Atlantic)
1963: My Mother's Eyes (Pacific Jazz) with Charles Kynard
1963: Move on Over (Argo)
1963: Now! (Impulse!)
1963: Salt And Pepper (Impulse)
1963: Soul Shack (Prestige)
1963: Stitt Goes Latin (Roost)
1963: Primitivo Soul! (Prestige)
1964: My Main Man (Argo) with Bennie Green
1964: Shangri-La (Prestige) with Don Patterson
1964: Soul People (Prestige) with Booker Ervin and Don Patterson
1965: Inter-Action (Cadet) with Zoot Sims
1965: Broadway Soul (Colpix)
1965: "The Double-O-Soul of Sonny Stitt, Part 1"/"The Double-O-Soul of Sonny Stitt, Part 2" (Wingate) (Single)
1965: "Concerto For Jazz Lovers"/"Just Dust" (Wingate) (Single)
1965: "Stitt's Groove"/"Marr's Groove" (Wingate) (Single) with Hank Marr
1965: Sax Expressions (Roost)
1965: Live at Ronnie Scott's (Ronnie Scott's Jazz House) with Dick Morrissey
1965: The Matadors Meet the Bull (Roulette)
1965: Pow! (Prestige)
1965: Night Crawler (Prestige) with Don Patterson
1966: Soul in the Night (Cadet) with Bunky Green
1966: What's New!!! (Roulette)
1966: I Keep Comin' Back! (Roulette)
1966: Deuces Wild (Atlantic) with Robin Kenyatta
1967: Parallel-a-Stitt (Roulette)
1968: Made for Each Other (Delmark) released 1972
1968: Soul Electricity! (Prestige)
1968: Little Green Apples (Solid State)
1968: Come Hither  (Solid State)
1969: It's Magic (Delmark) released 2005
1969: Night Letter (Prestige)
1971: Turn It On! (Prestige)
1971: You Talk That Talk! (Prestige) with Gene Ammons
1971: Black Vibrations (Prestige)
1971: Just the Way It Was (Hyena)
1972: Tune-Up! (Cobblestone)
1972: Goin' Down Slow (Prestige)
1972: Constellation (Cobblestone)
1972: So Doggone Good (Prestige)
1972: 12! (Muse)
1973: Mr. Bojangles (Cadet)
1973: The Champ (Muse)
1973: God Bless Jug and Sonny (Prestige) with Gene Ammons
1973: Left Bank Encores (Prestige) with Gene Ammons
1973: Together Again for the Last Time (Prestige) with Gene Ammons
1974: Satan (Cadet)
1975: Never Can Say Goodbye (Cadet)
1975: Mellow (Muse)
1975: Dumpy Mama (Flying Dutchman)
1975: My Buddy: Sonny Stitt Plays for Gene Ammons (Muse)
1975: Blues for Duke (Muse)
1976: Stomp Off Let's Go (Flying Dutchman)
1976: Forecast: Sonny & Red (Catalyst) with Red Holloway
1977: I Remember Bird (Catalyst)
1977: Sonny Stitt with Strings: A Tribute to Duke Ellington (Catalyst)
1978: The Sonny Stitt Quintet (Finite)
1978: Sonny Stitt Meets Sadik Hakim (Progressive)
1980: Groovin' High (Atlas)
1980: Atlas Blues "Blow & Ballad" (Atlas)
1980: Sonny's Back (Muse)
1981: In Style (Muse)
1981: Sonny, Sweets and Jaws: Live at Bubbas, (Who's Who in Jazz) with Harry "Sweets" Edison, Eddie "Lockjaw" Davis
1981: Just in Case You Forgot How Bad He Really Was (32 Jazz)
1983: The Last Stitt Sessions (Muse)
1988: Sonny Stitt Featuring Howard McGhee (Jazz Life) with Howard McGhee

As sideman
With Gene Ammons
All Star Sessions (Prestige, 1950–55 [1959])
Jug and Sonny (Chess, 1948–51 [1960]) 
Boss Tenors (Verve, 1961)
Boss Tenors in Orbit! (Verve, 1962)
Soul Summit (Prestige, 1962)
You Talk That Talk! (Prestige, 1971)
God Bless Jug and Sonny (Prestige, 1973)
Left Bank Encores (Prestige, 1973)
Together Again for the Last Time (Prestige, 1974)

With Art Blakey
A Jazz Message (Impulse!, 1963)
In Walked Sonny (Sonet, 1975)

With Miles Davis
Miles Davis in Stockholm 1960 Complete with John Coltrane and Sonny Stitt (Dragon, 1992)

With Dizzy Gillespie
The Modern Jazz Sextet (Verve, 1956) with Skeeter Best, John Lewis,  Percy Heath and Charli Persip
Duets (Verve, 1957) Quintets featuring Sonny Stitt or Sonny Rollins; with Ray Bryant, Tommy Bryant and Charlie Persip 
Sonny Side Up (Verve, 1957 [rel. 1959]) Sextet featuring Sonny Stitt and Sonny Rollins; with Ray Bryant, Tommy Bryant and Charlie Persip 
The Giants of Jazz (Atlantic, 1971) with Art Blakey, Al McKibbon, Thelonious Monk and Kai Winding
The Bop Session (Sonet, 1975) with John Lewis, Hank Jones, Percy Heath and Max Roach

With Milt Jackson
Loose Walk (Palcoscenico, 1980)

With Don Patterson
Patterson's People (Prestige, 1964)
The Boss Men (Prestige, 1965)
Funk You! (Prestige, 1968)
Brothers-4 (Prestige, 1969)
Donny Brook (Prestige, 1969)
Tune Up! (Prestige, 1964–69)

With Oscar Peterson
 The Oscar Peterson Trio with Sonny Stitt, Roy Eldridge and Jo Jones at Newport (Verve, 1957)

With Zimbo Trio
 Zimbo Convida Sonny Stitt (Clam, 1979)

References

External links

Sonny Stitt at Verve Records
Sonny Stitt at the Hard Bop Homepage
BBC - Radio 3 Jazz Profiles - Sonny Stitt

1924 births
1982 deaths
African-American saxophonists
American jazz saxophonists
American male saxophonists
Bebop saxophonists
Hard bop saxophonists
Miles Davis Quintet members
Musicians from Saginaw, Michigan
Musicians from Boston
Argo Records artists
Cobblestone Records artists
Verve Records artists
Muse Records artists
Impulse! Records artists
Prestige Records artists
Transatlantic Records artists
Atlantic Records artists
Flying Dutchman Records artists
20th-century American musicians
20th-century saxophonists
Jazz musicians from Massachusetts
Jazz musicians from Michigan
American male jazz musicians
Deaths from cancer in Washington, D.C.
The Giants of Jazz members
Black Lion Records artists
HighNote Records artists
20th-century American male musicians